, sometimes romanized as moé, is a Japanese word that refers to feelings of strong affection mainly towards characters in anime, manga, video games, and other media directed at the otaku market. Moe, however, has also gained usage to refer to feelings of affection towards any subject.

Moe is related to neoteny and the feeling of "cuteness" a character can evoke. The word moe originated in the late 1980s and early 1990s in Japan and is of uncertain origin, although there are several theories on how it came into use. Moe characters have expanded through Japanese media, and the concept has been commercialised. Contests, both online and in the real world, exist for moe-styled things, including one run by one of the Japanese game rating boards. Various notable commentators such as Tamaki Saitō, Hiroki Azuma, and Kazuya Tsurumaki have also given their take on moe and its meaning.

Meaning 
Moe used in slang refers to feelings of affection, adoration, devotion, and excitement felt towards characters that appear in manga, anime, video games, and other media (usually Japanese). Characters that elicit feelings of moe are called "moe characters". The word has also evolved to be used regarding all kinds of topics. Included in the meaning of the word is the idea that "deep feelings felt towards a particular subject" is used in cases where a simple "like" is not enough to express the feeling. The common feature in all feelings of moe is that the subject of such feelings is something that one cannot possibly have a real relationship with, like a fictional character, a pop idol, or an inorganic substance. It can be considered a kind of "pseudo-romance", but it is not always seen to be the same as "romance".

Origins
The term's origin and etymology are unknown. The term first became popular in 1993-94 among users of Japanese bulletin board systems.

Psychologist Tamaki Saitō identifies it as coming from the Japanese word for "budding", . Ken Kitabayashi of the Nomura Research Institute has defined moe as "being strongly attracted to one's ideals". Kitabayashi has identified the word moe to be a pun with the Japanese godan verb for 'to sprout', and its homophone 'to burn', . Along the same line of thought, Kitabayashi has identified it to be a pun with the Japanese ichidan verb for 'to sprout'  and its homophone 'to burn' , which mean 'to burn' (in the sense of one's heart burning, or burning with passion). 

Anthropologist Patrick Galbraith cites Morikawa Kaichirō, who argues that the term came from internet message boards such as NIFTY-Serve and Tokyo BBS in the 1990s, from fans discussing bishõjo (beautiful girl) characters. Galbraith argues that moe has its roots in the development of bishõjo characters in Japanese subcultures in the 1970s and 80s. This was exemplified in the lolicon boom of the 1980s, a "fertile ground" for the "budding desire for fictional characters".

Comiket organiser Ichikawa Koichi has described Lum from Urusei Yatsura as being both the source of moe and the first tsundere. The character of Clarisse from Hayao Miyazaki's The Castle of Cagliostro (1979) has also been cited as a potential ancestral example., with Lupin acting like an older brother to Clarisse and taunting the Count for marrying someone half his age. According to culture critic Hiroki Azuma, as Rei Ayanami became a more prominent character among fans, she "changed the rules" governing what people regarded as moe-inspiring. The industry has since created many characters which share her traits of pale skin, blue hair and a "quiet personality".

Usage

Commercial application

Moe characters have expanded within the Japanese media market. In 2003, the market for moe media such as printed media, video, and games was worth 88 billion yen; roughly one-third of the estimated 290 billion yen otaku market in Japan. In 2009, Brad Rice, editor-in-chief of Japanator, said that "moe has literally become an economic force" saying that more products use some element of moe in order to sell better. Rice also goes on to say that moe is used to get anime and manga works out to "hardcore fans who buy excessive amounts of items related to the character of their desire."

John Oppliger from AnimeNation traced the first decade of the 2000s as the time when moe became increasingly popular and recognized. Commercialization was a result of interest that followed, and moe evolved from being a non-sexual desire to being a sexually sublimated fascination with cuteness. Oppliger goes on to say that moe shifted entirely from an interchange between character and viewer, to a focused fetish of viewers. Examples used by Oppliger include the series; K-On, Lucky Star, and Moetan where he points out they are "revolved around adorable, whimsical, clumsy, early-adolescent girl characters in order to evoke, enflame, and manipulate the interests and affections of viewers." Rather than evoking moe feelings, they were literally moe characters that had defining characteristics of the moe style. Oppliger referred to these girl characters as "adorably cute, just a bit sexually appealing, and self-conscious but not yet cynical" going on to say that they demand notice and adoration, rather than passively earning it.

With moe anthropomorphism, moe characteristics are applied to give human elements to non-human objects. The Gradius video game series features a spaceship named Vic Viper. For a spin-off game, moe is applied to Vic Viper to create Otomedius.

Sexual attraction
Sometimes feelings of moe towards fictional characters include "sexual excitement", or are understood in the context where "lots of beautiful girls and boobs appear." In these cases, feelings of pure affection that gradually become stronger over time can lead to these feelings of eroticism. In addition, it is pointed that sexual desire oriented to such characters differs from a desire toward humans.

Moe, however, is also considered to be distinct from pure lust. While small amounts of lust is generally considered moe, a feeling that focuses too heavily on lust is considered outside the scope of moe. In a light novel by Nagaru Tanigawa, one of the characters mentions that the distinction between moe and pure lust can be made based on whether one can still maintain feelings of affection even after one has indulged in masturbation. According to commentator,  who considers moe to be "romance within one's head", the ideal kind of love within moe is "romantic love".

Contests
Several informal contests or rankings for characters considered to be moe exist on the internet. One such contest is the Anime Saimoe Tournament, organized by members of the textboard 2channel, which ran every year from 2002, until its cancellation after the 2014 contest due to declining interest. Moe characters from the fiscal year starting 1 July and ending 30 June the following year were eligible. Each tournament had at least 280 moe characters. Spin-offs of the Saimoe Tournament include RPG Saimoe, which has video game characters, and SaiGAR, a competition between the "manliest men of anime". In 2006 and 2007, the Saimoe Tournament became an increasingly international event; 2channel users obliged foreign otaku by putting up an English version of their rules page. The International Saimoe League, also known as ISML, is another online moe popularity contest that is for a worldwide audience. The contest started in 2008 and was held annually. Initially, only female characters were eligible, a male exhibition tournament was added in 2011, which would take place after the end of the main tournament. It was made into an official tournament alongside the female characters in 2015.

Moe contests also exist in magazine publications, and in the real world. The Moe Game Awards are given annually to bishōjo games published that year in various categories, such as background music, character design, fandisc, graphics, and erotic content. They were started in 2006 as the Bishōjo Game Awards, but their name was changed to Moe Game Awards in 2009. It is sponsored by the Japanese game rating board Ethics Organization of Computer Software (EOCS) and is described by them as "an R18 game industry version of the Academy Awards". Magazines that have moe contests in them include the Japanese magazine Dengeki Moeoh which runs a column called  and features the top 10 moe characters of the month, as determined by reader votes.

Commentary
There are various interpretations of the concept of moe, and the subject has been heavily discussed. Psychologist Tamaki Saitō considers the moe used by otaku to be the embodiment of their particular kind of sexuality. Saitō points out that while otaku creations fulfill an abnormal impression of sexuality, few otaku actually apply this impression to real life. He thus argues that moe is something that sustains the otaku's sexuality within a fictional world, with the fiction itself being their subject of desire and having no need for reality.

On the other hand, critic Hiroki Azuma rejects Saitō's argument as "too complicated." Azuma argues that "to moe" is simply the act of analyzing each of the character's moe characteristics and expanding on those characteristics within the mind, and thus differs from mere feelings of empathy. These characteristics can be physical ones, such as cat ears or a maid costume, or a personality archetype, such as that of the character Rei Ayanami. Azuma sees this process as an otaku's act of satisfying their desires among their limited relations, and considers it to be part of a broader trend of "animalization," or the fulfillment of small desires isolated from the context of a grand narrative. Azuma, therefore, simplifies Saitō's idea of moe into the idea of attaining signals of sexual excitement within an isolated environment, similar to the act of training an animal.

In contrast, Tōru Honda argues against the idea that moe is simply "the act of arousal in response to signals, and thus animalization" and argues that this interpretation does not allow one to recall the essence of moe. Honda considers moe to be the act of remembering ideals among the background signals, an act of necessity that arose as the romance rejected by religion continued to be supported by materialism, and thus interprets it as a mental activity relevant to the contexts of mythology and religion. Furthermore, Honda asserts that this "animalization" phenomenon only arose after the "economic bubble" period of Japan, when people consumed real romance- and sex-like products, and says that since moe is commonly interpreted to be in competition with the act of searching for romance in real life, it is thus the antithesis of male-dominant machoism. Also, while Saitō doesn't distinguish moe from more violent types of sexual abnormalities and speaks of moe in the context of "sentō bishōjo" (beautiful fighting girl), Honda on the other hand treats moe as the polar opposite of the hunter-ish kind of sexuality featuring in more fiendish works like those by Henry Darger.

Anime director Kazuya Tsurumaki defines moe to be "the act of filling in missing information about characters on one's own." Accepting this view, writer  explains that characters are born from human instinct, which is the exact reason why one can be charmed by them much more than one could by real people. Toshio Okada says that while he himself has not fully understood moe, he defines it as not simply being stirred emotionally by beautiful girls, but also as the meta-viewpoint of seeing oneself falling into such a state.

In The Moe Manifesto, anthropologist Patrick Galbraith defines moe as an affective response to fictional characters or representations of them. The applications of this definition are widespread to political, economic, and cultural discourses. For an example in practice, Matthew Brummer describes how Japan's Self Defense Force utilizes popular culture and the moe that it engenders to shape public perceptions of the military establishment: The Manga Military.

See also
 .moe
 Amae
 Chibi (slang)
 Figure moe zoku
 Ingénue
 Kawaii, cuteness
 Lolicon
 Moe anthropomorphism
 Moe book
 Nijikon
 Parasocial interaction
 Sexy baby voice

References

Citations

Works cited

Further reading

External links

 Towards a Cartography of Japanese Anime: Anno Hideaki's >>Evangelion - Through an interview with Hiroki Azuma dealing with Evangelion the article sheds light on the origins of the moe phenomenon
 "Superflat Japanese Postmodernity" – cultural critic Hiroki Azuma on otaku aesthetics, including moe
 Mondo Japan, 2004: "New language from OTAKU world: moe"

 
Anime and manga terminology
Fandom
Heisei period
Otaku slang